Forecastle Summit is, at , the highest mountain summit in the northern part of the Staten Island Heights, with a rounded top that gives a commanding view of Fry Glacier and Benson Glacier, in the Convoy Range, Victoria Land, Antarctica. One of the nautical names in the Convoy Range, it was so named by a New Zealand Antarctic Research Program field party in the 1989–90 season.

References 

Mountains of Victoria Land
Scott Coast
Summits